Rhen can refer to:

Rhens, a municipality in the district Mayen-Koblenz in Rhineland-Palatinate, Germany 
Rhens (Verbandsgemeinde), a collective municipality within Rhens 
Upper Rhenish Circle, an Imperial Circle of the Holy Roman Empire
Upper Rhenish Master, an artist  active ca. 1410-20, possibly in Strasbourg
Lower Rhenish–Westphalian Circle, an Imperial Circle of the Holy Roman Empire
Lower Rhenish Music Festival, annual classical music festival at Pentecost between 1818 and 1958
Rhen Var, a planet in the Star Wars Universe
Battle of Rhen Var, a battle in the Clone Wars (Star Wars)
Rhen's Quest, the first in the commercial Aveyond series of games
Crimson Rhen, the main protagonist of the Shadowbinders comic book series

See also
Rhene (disambiguation)